Hertford was the name of a parliamentary constituency in Hertfordshire, which elected Members of Parliament (MPs) from 1298 until 1974.

History 
The Parliamentary Borough of Hertford was represented by two MPs in the House of Commons of England from 1298 to 1707, then of the House of Commons of Great Britain  from 1707 to 1800, and finally in the House of Commons of the Parliament of the United Kingdom from 1801 onwards.  Under the Boundaries Act of 1868, its representation was reduced to 1 MP.

The Redistribution of Seats Act 1885 (which followed on from the Third Reform Act) abolished the Parliamentary Borough and it gave its name to one of four Divisions of the abolished three-member Parliamentary County of Hertfordshire, and was formally named as the Eastern or Hertford Division of Hertfordshire.

As well from the Borough of Hertford, the enlarged constituency included the towns of Ware, Bishop's Stortford and Hoddesdon. It remained largely unchanged until 1955, but was radically altered for the 1955 general election. It was abolished in 1974.

Boundaries and boundary changes
1885–1918: The Borough of Hertford, the Sessional Divisions of Bishop's Stortford and Cheshunt, parts of the Sessional Divisions of Hertford and Ware, and in the Sessional Division of Aldbury the parishes of Great Hadham and Little Hadham.

1918–1950: The Borough of Hertford, the Urban Districts of Bishop's Stortford, Cheshunt, Hoddesdon, Sawbridgeworth, and Ware, the Rural Districts of Hadham and Ware, and in the Rural District of Hertford the parishes of Bayford, Bengeo Rural, Bengeo Urban, Bramfield, Brickendon Liberty, Brickendon Rural, Hertingfordbury, Little Amwell, Little Berkhamsted, St Andrew Rural, St John Rural, Stapleford, and Tewin.

Minor changes.

1950–1955: The Borough of Hertford, the Urban Districts of Bishop's Stortford, Cheshunt, Hoddesdon, Sawbridgeworth, and Ware, the Rural District of Ware, in the Rural District of Braughing the parishes of Albury, Braughing, Brent Pelham, Furneux Pelham, High Wych, Little Hadham, Much Hadham, Stocking Pelham, and Thorley, and in the Rural District of Hertford the parishes of Bayford, Bengeo Rural, Bengeo Urban, Bramfield, Brickendon Liberty, Brickendon Rural, Hertingfordbury, Little Amwell, Little Berkhamsted, St Andrew Rural, St John Rural, Stapleford, and Tewin.

Nominal changes only to reflect changes to rural districts.

1955–1974: The Borough of Hertford, the Urban District of Welwyn Garden City, and the Rural Districts of Hatfield, Hertford, and Welwyn.

Significant changes with only the Municipal Borough and the part of the Rural District of Hertford retained.  The remainder of the constituency formed the basis of the new County Constituency of East Hertfordshire.  The Urban District of Welwyn Garden City and the Rural District of Welwyn were transferred from St Albans; the Rural District of Hatfield from Barnet; and the remainder of the Rural District of Hertford from Hitchin.

The constituency was abolished in the redistribution taking effect for the February 1974 general election. The Municipal Borough and Rural District of Hertford were included in the new County Constituency of Hertford and Stevenage, with remaining areas forming the new County Constituency of Welwyn and Hatfield.

Members of Parliament

Hertford borough (1298-1885)

1298-1640

1640-1868

1868-1885

Hertford county constituency (1885-1974)

Elections

Elections in the 1830s

 

 

The 1832 election was later declared void, but a new writ was not issued during the course of the parliament.

Cowper was appointed as a commissioner of Greenwich Hospital, requiring a by-election.

Elections in the 1840s

 

Cowper was appointed a Civil Lord of the Admiralty, requiring a by-election.

Elections in the 1850s

 

Cowper was appointed Civil Lord of the Admiralty, requiring a by-election.

Cowper was appointed president of the General Board of Health, requiring a by-election.

Cowper was appointed Vice-President of the Committee of the Council on Education, requiring a by-election.

 

 

Cowper was appointed Vice-President of the Board of Trade, requiring a by-election.

Elections in the 1860s
Cowper was appointed First Commissioner of Works and Public Buildings, requiring a by-election.

Townshend-Farquhar's death caused a by-election.

Seat reduced to one member

Elections in the 1870s

Elections in the 1880s 

Balfour was appointed President of the Local Government Board, requiring a by-election.

Elections in the 1890s 

Smith's death caused a by-election.

Elections in the 1900s

Elections in the 1910s 

General Election 1914–15:

Another General Election was required to take place before the end of 1915. The political parties had been making preparations for an election to take place and by July 1914, the following candidates had been selected; 
Unionist: John Rolleston 
Liberal: 
Independent: W. H. Rolfe

* Barnard was also the nominee of the National Farmers' Union

Elections in the 1920s 

 
 
 
 

* Sueter was also the nominee of the Independent Parliamentary Group.

Elections in the 1930s

Elections in the 1940s 
General Election 1939–40:
Another General Election was required to take place before the end of 1940. The political parties had been making preparations for an election to take place from 1939 and by the end of this year, the following candidates had been selected; 
Conservative: Murray Sueter
Labour: Mitchell W. Gordon

Elections in the 1950s

Elections in the 1960s

Elections in the 1970s

References

Robert Beatson, A Chronological Register of Both Houses of Parliament (London: Longman, Hurst, Res & Orme, 1807) 
D. Brunton & D. H. Pennington, Members of the Long Parliament (London: George Allen & Unwin, 1954)
Cobbett's Parliamentary history of England, from the Norman Conquest in 1066 to the year 1803 (London: Thomas Hansard, 1808) 
F. W. S. Craig, British Parliamentary Election Results 1832-1885 (2nd edition, Aldershot: Parliamentary Research Services, 1989)
F W S Craig, "British Parliamentary Election Results 1918-1949" (Glasgow: Political Reference Publications, 1969)
Henry Stooks Smith, The Parliaments of England from 1715 to 1847 (2nd edition, edited by FWS Craig - Chichester: Parliamentary Reference Publications, 1973)

Parliamentary constituencies in Hertfordshire (historic)
Constituencies of the Parliament of the United Kingdom disestablished in 1974
Hertford